Rascanya is a district of Valencia, Spain. It had 52.764 inhabitants as of 2017

Geography

Subdivision
The district is administratively divided into 3 wards (Barrios):
Els Orriols
Torrefiel
Sant Llorenç

References

Geography of Valencia